Omphalomargarites is a genus of sea snails, marine gastropod mollusks in the family Trochidae, the top snails.

Species
Species within the genus Omphalomargarites include:
 Omphalomargarites sagamiensis Kuroda & Habe, 1971
Species brought into synonymy
 Omphalomargarites vorticifera (Dall, 1873): synonym of Margarites vorticiferus (Dall, 1873)

References

 Higo, S., Callomon, P. & Goto, Y. (1999). Catalogue and bibliography of the marine shell-bearing Mollusca of Japan. Osaka. : Elle Scientific Publications. 749 pp.

External links
 To World Register of Marine Species

 
Trochidae
Monotypic gastropod genera